Pedro Nuno Fernandes Ferreira (born 13 January 1995), known as Pedro Nuno, is a Portuguese professional footballer who plays as an attacking midfielder for Turkish club Adanaspor.

Club career
Born in Buarcos, Figueira da Foz, Pedro Nuno finished his youth spell with local Académica de Coimbra, joining the club at the age of 17. On 16 August 2014, he made his first-team – and Primeira Liga – debut, coming on as a 90th-minute substitute for Richard Ofori in a 1–1 home draw against Sporting CP. He scored his first goal the following 23 May 2015 in the last matchday, a 2–4 loss to Vitória S.C. also at the Estádio Cidade de Coimbra.

Pedro Nuno netted four times in only 12 games in the 2015–16 season, but his team returned to the Segunda Liga after a 14-year stay. On 28 November 2016 he signed a four-and-a-half-year contract with defending champions S.L. Benfica, moving to C.D. Tondela in a loan deal nine days later.

On 9 July 2018, Pedro Nuno cut ties with the Estádio da Luz-based club and joined Moreirense F.C. for three seasons. He scored five goals in his debut campaign, helping the side finish sixth and narrowly miss out on qualification for the UEFA Europa League.

Pedro Nuno spent the vast majority of 2020–21 on the sidelines, after rupturing the ligaments in his right knee. In June 2021, he agreed to a three-year contract at Belenenses SAD.

On 23 June 2022, Pedro Nuno was due to sign for Maccabi Bnei Reineh F.C. in the Israeli Premier League, but he was released one month later.

On 29 August 2022, Nuno signed a one-year contract, with an optional second year, with Adanaspor in the Turkish second-tier TFF First League.

References

External links

1995 births
Living people
People from Figueira da Foz
Sportspeople from Coimbra District
Portuguese footballers
Association football midfielders
Associação Naval 1º de Maio players
S.L. Benfica footballers
Associação Académica de Coimbra – O.A.F. players
C.D. Tondela players
Moreirense F.C. players
Belenenses SAD players
Adanaspor footballers
Primeira Liga players
Liga Portugal 2 players
TFF First League players
Portuguese expatriate footballers
Expatriate footballers in Turkey
Portuguese expatriate sportspeople in Turkey